Pachyphysis is a genus of lichenized fungi within the family Lecideaceae. This is a monotypic genus, containing the single species Pachyphysis ozarkana.

References

External links
Pachyphysis at Index Fungorum

Lichen genera
Lecideales genera
Monotypic Lecanoromycetes genera